Singing To the Bus Driver or Hail To the Bus Driver, an anonymous United States folk song dating to the mid-20th century.  It is a popular children's song, particularly among pre-teens, and is often sung by children on school bus trips to keep themselves amused.  It is sung to the tune of the traditional children's songs The More We Get Together and Did You Ever See A Lassie?, which in turn are derived from a 1679 Viennese tune by Marx Augustin, Oh du lieber Augustin.

Lyrics

Hail to the bus driver,
bus driver, bus driver,
Hail to the bus driver,
bus driver-man
He screams and he cusses,
He rams other buses.
Hail to the bus driver,
bus driver-man.

In popular culture
 In 1992 the song, as "Hail To the Bus Driver," appears in The Simpsons's season 3 episode "The Otto Show." A busload of children sings the song to Principal Skinner when he replaces Otto as the bus driver, with Skinner laughing and joining them, later humming the song. Rather than the lyrics above, the children sing the variation "He drinks and he cusses, he stinks up the buses." In a later scene, Ralph Wiggum sings "He steps on the clutch and the toilet goes flush," enraging Skinner.
 A 2012 episode of Jake and Amir begins with Ben Schwartz singing "Hail to the milkman" to the tune of this song.

References

American children's songs
Traditional children's songs
Children's street culture
American folk songs
Songs about alcohol
Songs about buses
Songs about occupations